The National College of Professional Technical Education (Conalep) is a public high school in Mexico focused on the technical training of its students. It was founded in 1978 by José Antonio Padilla Segura. Its mission is to train technical professionals through a competency-based model, in addition to offering various specialized study courses. It is recognized as a center for training, evaluation and certification of labor competencies and technological services.

History

Background 
The National College of Technical Professional Education (CONALEP) is an educational institution of the upper secondary level that is part of the National System of Technological Education. It was created by presidential decree in 1978 as a Decentralized Public Organization of the Federal Government, with its own legal personality and assets. Its main objective was oriented to the training of technical professionals, graduates of secondary school. It was founded in 1978 by engineer and Mexican politic José Antonio Padilla Segura.

Conalep SPP 

The Conalep SPP was a building located between the streets of Iturbide and Humboldt, in the Historic Center of Mexico City, which was destroyed by the 8.1 magnitude earthquake of September 19, 1985.

In this school, the classes normally started at 7 o'clock in the morning, so the students were already in class when the quake struck. Some data indicate that around 120 people died and some disappeared in this building. Literally, this building was split in two, the part that overlooked Humboldt Street stood and the part that overlooked Iturbide Street collapsed falling floor to floor and pulling the building towards that street.

Present 
In 1993, the decree was reformed to open expectations regarding job training, inter-sectoral linkage, community support, and technological advice and assistance to companies. In 1994, according to the needs of the country, the school adopted the Competency Standards Based Education (EBNC) scheme, initiating the reform of its educational model in congruence with said approach. In 1998, as a result of his experience in the development of training programs under the EBNC scheme, he undertook a project for the accreditation of schools as Centers for the Evaluation of Labor Competences with the purpose of promoting the evaluation of competences acquired throughout the year. life, with the reference in Technical Standards of Labor Competence (NTCL).

In 2003, a new Academic Reform was carried out, with which the methodology of Education and Training Based on Contextualized Competences (ECBCC) is innovated and consolidated. For this, it incorporates in a generalized way in the study programs the concept of contextualized competences, as a methodology that reinforces the learning, integrates it and makes it meaningful. Thus, a new flexible and multimodal curricular model is built, in which labor and professional competencies are complemented with basic competencies and key competences that reinforce technological training and strengthen the scientific and humanistic education of the students.

It is currently a federalized institution, constituted by a central unit that regulates and coordinates the system; 30 State Colleges; a Decentralized Operation Unit in the Federal District and the Representation of the State of Oaxaca. This structure makes possible the operation of services in 273 schools distributed in the main cities and industrial zones of the country and eight Technology Assistance and Services Centers (CAST).

The system is characterized by the formation of Bachiller Technical Professionals, who have the knowledge, skills, abilities and attitudes that guarantee their successful incorporation into the labor market, their competitive access to higher education and the strengthening of their foundations for an integral performance in their personal, social and professional life.

Campuses 
Conalep Ing. Bernardo Quintana Arrioja

Educative offer 
Conalep's curriculum is made up of 48 careers grouped into seven occupational training areas, which are taught nationwide in 308 schools.

The institution offers different bachelor technical professional careers based on a competency scheme, through which the graduate acquires the main knowledge and experience to integrate into the labor field. The course is completed in 3 years and at the time of graduation, a professional degree is awarded which endorses the student as a Bachiller Technical Professional, a professional certificate and the certificate of higher secondary education (High school).

Gallery

References

External links 

 

1978 establishments in Mexico
Educational institutions established in 1978
High schools in Mexico